Tanunurwa Makoni (born 28 November 1999) is a Zimbabwean cricketer. He made his first-class debut on 18 December 2019, for Rangers in the 2019–20 Logan Cup. Prior to his first-class debut, he was named in Zimbabwe's squad for the 2018 Under-19 Cricket World Cup. He made his List A debut on 5 February 2020, for Rangers in the 2019–20 Pro50 Championship. In December 2020, he was selected to play for the Tuskers in the 2020–21 Logan Cup.

Career
On 4 February 2023, Makoni made his Test debut against the West Indies.

References

External links
 

1999 births
Living people
Zimbabwean cricketers
Rangers cricketers
Place of birth missing (living people)